Shunema is a rural locality (a settlement) and the administrative center of Shadegnskoye Rural Settlement of Velsky District, Arkhangelsk Oblast, Russia. The population was 421 as of 2014. There are 11 streets.

Geography 
Shunema is located on the Vel River, 26 km northwest of Velsk (the district's administrative centre) by road. Titovskaya is the nearest rural locality.

References 

Rural localities in Velsky District